The 1947 Iowa Hawkeyes football team was an American football team that represented the University of Iowa in the 1947 Big Nine Conference football season. The team compiled a 3–5–1 record (2–3–1 against conference opponents) and finished in a tie for sixth place in the Big Nine Conference. After opening its season with a 59–0 shutout victory over North Dakota State, the team was outscored 179 to 86 in its remaining eight games.

Head coach Eddie Anderson was in his sixth season as Iowa's head coach; he was inducted into the College Football Hall of Fame in 1971. On the evening before the final game of the 1947 season, Anderson submitted his resignation as head coach (effective in July 1948), citing "considerable loose talk" about the state of the program.  The team responded with a 13–7 victory over Minnesota.  Fans begged Anderson to reconsider, and the Iowa athletic board denied his resignation, promising him a larger coaching staff and other football improvements. Anderson decided to stay, saying, "I'm glad we got things straightened out."

The team's statistical leaders included Bob Smith with 395 rushing yards and 30 points scored, Al DiMarco with 644 passing yards, and Emlen Tunnell with 262 receiving yards. Tunell later played 14 years in the National Football League and was inducted into the Pro Football Hall of Fame. Other players of note included Jack Dittmer, who later played six years in Major League Baseball, and end Harold Schoener, who was selected as the most valuable player on the 1947 Iowa team.

The team played its home games at Iowa Stadium. It drew 187,844 spectators at four home games, an average of 46,961 per game.

Schedule

References

Iowa
Iowa Hawkeyes football seasons
Iowa Hawkeyes football